Konsoy (also Kaindisoy) is a town in northern Tajikistan. It is located in Sughd Region. It is part of the city of Guliston, and its population is 6,000 (2020).

References

Populated places in Sughd Region